American singer and actress Ariana Grande has won many accolades and awards throughout her career. Her debut album Yours Truly was released in 2013, which debuted at No. 1 on the US Billboard 200 chart. The album spawned three singles "The Way", "Baby I" and "Right There", all which entered the Hot 100. That same year, she won New Artist of the Year at the American Music Awards. She played the titular role of Cat in the teen sitcom Sam & Cat (2013–14), for which she won a Favorite TV Actress award at the Nickelodeon Kids' Choice Awards.

In 2014, Grande released her second studio album, My Everything, preceded by its lead single "Problem". At the 31st annual MTV Video Music Awards, "Problem" won the Best Pop Video award, and garnered three nominations, including Best Female Video. The single also won Best Song at the 2014 MTV Europe Music Awards. She won the Favorite Breakout Artist award at the 40th ceremony of the People's Choice Awards. At the 2014 Young Hollywood Awards, Grande earned four nominations, including Hottest Music Artist. At the 57th Annual Grammy Awards, Grande was nominated for two awards. In 2015, she won another American Music Award for Favorite Pop/Rock Female Artist and an iHeartRadio Music Award for Best Collaboration for "Bang Bang". She has won a total of ten Teen Choice Awards and six Radio Disney Music Awards.

In 2016, Grande released her third studio album, Dangerous Woman. She was nominated for five awards at the 2016 MTV Video Music Awards, which included Best Pop Video and Best Female Video for her second single "Into You". She won the American Music Award for Artist of the Year. At the 59th Annual Grammy Awards, Grande was nominated for two more awards, for Best Pop Solo Performance for her single "Dangerous Woman" as well as Best Pop Vocal Album, her second nomination in that category. In 2017, she was nominated for Artist of the Year at the 2017 MTV Video Music Awards.

In 2018, Grande released her fourth studio album, Sweetener, releasing lead single "No Tears Left to Cry". Grande was nominated for five awards at the 2018 MTV Video Music Awards, including Artist of the Year and Video of the Year for "No Tears Left to Cry", but ultimately won Best Pop Video for the latter song. In December 2018, Grande was named Billboards Woman of the Year. In 2019, Grande released her fifth studio album, Thank U, Next, which includes the lead single "Thank U, Next". Grande was nominated for two awards at the 61st Annual Grammy Awards, winning her first award for Best Pop Vocal Album for Sweetener. She was also nominated for Best Pop Solo Performance for Sweeteners second single, "God is a Woman". Grande also won the award for International Female Solo Artist at the 2019 Brit Awards. Grande was nominated for nine awards at the 2019 Billboard Music Awards, including Top Artist; she won two awards, for Billboard Chart Achievement and Top Female Artist. Grande was also nominated for 12 awards at the 2019 MTV Video Music Awards, including Video of the Year for "Thank U, Next". She won three awards, including Artist of the Year. Grande was also nominated for five Grammy awards at the 62nd Annual Grammy Awards, including Album of the Year and Best Pop Vocal Album for Thank U, Next and Record of the Year for "7 Rings". 

Grande was nominated for nine VMAs at the 2020 MTV Video Music Awards, including Video of the Year for "Rain on Me" with Lady Gaga. Grande would go on to win a Grammy Award at the 63rd Annual Grammy Awards for Best Pop Duo/Group Performance for "Rain on Me" with Lady Gaga, making it the first female-collaboration to win the award. As of 2021, Grande has so far broken a total of 30 Guinness World Records.  At the 64th Annual Grammy Awards, Grande was nominated for three awards, for Best Pop Vocal Album for her sixth studio album, Positions, which became her fifth consecutive nomination in this category, tied for the most by any artist, and Best Pop Solo Performance for the single, "Positions", where she also tied for the most nominations in this category with four total. Furthermore, for her work on Doja Cat's third studio album, Planet Her, as a collaborator and songwriter on the track, "I Don't Do Drugs", she was nominated for Album of the Year for the second time. In 2021, Grande starred in the film Don't Look Up, directed and written by Adam McKay, playing the character Riley Bina. For her role in the film - as well as for her contributions to the film's song, "Just Look Up", written and performed by Grande, she has received numerous nominations, including a Critics Choice Award and a Screen Actors Guild Award.

Awards and nominations

Other accolades

World records

Listicles

State honors

See also

Notes

References

Awards
Grande, Ariana